Marie Van Tassell (April 6, 1871 in Little Falls, New York – January 22, 1946 in Oakland, California) was an American stage and silent film actress. 
 
She starred in 15 films between 1915 and 1920.

Filmography
Curly (1915) as Mrs. Brewster (credited as Marie Van Tassel)
Billy Van Deusen's Shadow (1916) as Mrs. Smudge (credited as Marie Van Tassel)
Johnny's Jumble (1916) as Aunt
True Nobility (1916) as Mrs. Burton
April (1916) as Mrs. De Voe
The Counterfeit Earl (1916) as Mrs. Belknap
The Trail of the Thief (1916) (credited as Marie Van Tassel)
The Highest Bid (1916) as Elsie's mother
Purity (1916) as Truth
The Torch Bearer (1916) as Mrs. Huntley-Knox
Dulcie's Adventure (1916) as Aunt Netta
Peck o' Pickles (1916) as Caroline Pickett
The Only Road (1918) as Rosa Lopez
The Mask (1918) as Miss Prim (credited as Marie Van Tassel)
Sue of the South (1919) as Margaret Darwin
Deep Waters (1920) as Barzella Busteed

External links

 

People from Little Falls, New York
American silent film actresses
1871 births
1946 deaths
20th-century American actresses